The Tomb of Pope Julius II is a sculptural and architectural ensemble by Michelangelo and his assistants, originally commissioned in 1505 but not completed until 1545 on a much reduced scale. Originally intended for St. Peter's Basilica, the structure was instead placed in the church of San Pietro in Vincoli on the Esquiline in Rome after the pope's death. This church was patronized by the Della Rovere family from which Julius came, and he had been titular cardinal there. Julius II, however, is buried next to his uncle Sixtus IV in St. Peter's Basilica, so the final structure does not actually function as a tomb.

As originally conceived, the tomb would have been a colossal structure that would have given Michelangelo the room he needed for his superhuman, tragic beings. This project became one of the great disappointments of Michelangelo's life when the pope, for unexplained reasons, interrupted the commission, possibly because funds had to be diverted for Bramante's rebuilding of St. Peter's. The original project called for a freestanding, three-level structure with some 40 statues. After the pope's death in 1513, the scale of the project was reduced step-by-step until, in April 1532, a final contract specified a simple wall tomb with fewer than one-third of the figures originally planned. 

The most famous sculpture associated with the tomb is the figure of Moses, which Michelangelo completed during one of the sporadic resumptions of the work in 1513. Michelangelo felt that this was his most lifelike creation. Legend has it that upon its completion he struck the right knee commanding, "now speak!" as he felt that life was the only thing left inside the marble. There is a scar on the knee thought to be the mark of Michelangelo's hammer.

History
 1505 – Julius commissions a tomb from Michelangelo, who spends eight months choosing marble at Carrara. Sometime during construction, however, Michelangelo and the Pope have a quarrel, causing Michelangelo to leave Rome for his safety.
 1508 – Donato Bramante, apparently jealous of Michelangelo's commission, used Michelangelo's absence to convince the Pope that it is bad luck to have his tomb built during his own lifetime, and that Michelangelo's time would be better spent on the Sistine Chapel ceiling in the Vatican Palace. He, along with Michelangelo's other rivals, thought that Michelangelo would be unable to complete the massive ceiling project and thus be humiliated and leave Rome.
 1512 – With his decoration of the Sistine Chapel ceiling complete, Michelangelo resumed work on the tomb. Between 1512 and 1513 he completed three sculptures for the project: the Dying and Rebellious Slaves (now in the Louvre, Paris) and Moses (retained in the final design). 
 1513 – Julius died in February 1513. A new contract was drawn up on 6 May which specified a wall tomb. On 9 July Michelangelo contracted a stonemason, Antonio del Ponte a Sieve, to execute the architectural elements of the tomb's lower register, which can be seen in the final design. A large, ruined drawing attributed to Michelangelo survives from this phase of the project, in the Kupferstichkabinett in Berlin; a more legible facsimile by his pupil Jacomo Rocchetti is also in the same collection. The Metropolitan Museum of Art in New York City has a drawing of the tomb from this period.  Though no longer for a free-standing monument, the project in fact became more ambitious both in terms of size and the complexity of its iconography.
 1516 – Michelangelo agrees to a new contract with Julius’s heirs, who demand the completion of the project.
 1520s – Michelangelo carves The Genius of Victory and four unfinished Slaves (now in the Accademia, Florence).
 1532 – Michelangelo signs a second new contract, which involves a wall-tomb.
 1542 – Michelangelo begins the wall-tomb after negotiating final details with Julius′s grandson.
 1545 – The final tomb, more properly a funerary monument because Julius II is not interred there, is completed and installed in San Pietro in Vincoli; it includes Michelangelo’s Moses along with Leah and Rachel (probably completed by Michelangelo's assistants) on the lower level, and several other sculptures (definitely not by Michelangelo) on the upper level.

Sculptures
The statues of the Dying Slave and the Rebellious Slave were finished but not included in the monument in its last and reduced design. They are now in the Louvre. Another figure intended for Pope Julius' tomb is The Genius of Victory, now in the Palazzo Vecchio in Florence. Other sculptures for the tomb were the Young Slave, the Atlas Slave, the Bearded Slave and the Awakening Slave. The sculptures of Rachel and Leah, allegories of the contemplative and the active life, were executed by Raffaello da Montelupo, a pupil of Michelangelo. The other sculptures are by less experienced pupils.

See also
List of works by Michelangelo

References

Further reading
 Frommel, Christoph Luitpold, Maria Forcellino, Claudia Echinger-Maurach, Antonio Cassanelli, Roberto Jemolo, Forcellino, Antonio, Cassanelli, Roberto, and Jemolo, Andrea. Michelangelo's Tomb for Julius II : Genesis and Genius. Los Angeles: J. Paul Getty Museum, 2016.

External links

 
Papal tombs
16th-century architecture
16th-century sculptures
Sculptures in Rome